No Time for Sergeants is a 1954 best-selling novel by Mac Hyman, which was later adapted into a teleplay on The United States Steel Hour, a popular Broadway play and 1958 motion picture, as well as a 1964 television series. The book chronicles the misadventures of a country bumpkin named Will Stockdale who is drafted into the U.S. Army during World War II and assigned to the United States Army Air Forces. Hyman was in the Army Air Forces during World War II when it was part of the US Army.

Adaptations in other media
Ira Levin adapted Hyman's novel for a one-hour teleplay that appeared as an episode on The United States Steel Hour television series in 1955.  An expanded version appeared on Broadway at the Alvin Theatre later that year.  In 1958, a film version was released.

Television adaptation (1955)

Ira Levin's adaptation of the novel appeared live on 15 March 1955, on The United States Steel Hour, a television anthology series. It starred Andy Griffith as Will Stockdale, Harry Clark as his nemesis and inadvertent mentor Sergeant Orville King, Robert Emhardt, Eddie Le Roy, and Alexander Clark. The kinescope recording of the broadcast is available.

Broadway play
An expanded version of the play, written by Ira Levin, opened on Broadway at the Alvin Theatre on October 20, 1955, produced by Maurice Evans and directed by Morton DaCosta. Griffith reprised his role, Myron McCormick played Sgt. King, Roddy McDowell played Will's army buddy Ben, and Don Knotts made his Broadway debut as Corporal Manual Dexterity. Scenic designer Peter Larkin won a Tony Award in 1956, and Andy Griffith was nominated for a Tony for Best Featured Actor. The play ran for a total of 796 performances, closing on September 14, 1957.

Motion picture
See No Time for Sergeants (1958 film)

No Time for Sergeants was filmed and released by Warner Bros. in 1958. The film was directed by Mervyn LeRoy and starred Griffith, McCormick, Knotts, and most of the rest of the original Broadway cast. Warner Brothers contract stars Nick Adams  as Stockdale's fellow draftee Benjamin B. Whitledge and Murray Hamilton as Irving S. Blanchard joined the cast.

Television series

No Time for Sergeants came to the small screen in the fall of 1964. By this point, Griffith and Knotts were both established as stars of The Andy Griffith Show and were no longer available. The television series No Time for Sergeants starred Sammy Jackson who had had one line in the film version.
When Jackson read that Warner Brothers was going to produce a television sitcom version of No Time for Sergeants for ABC he wrote directly to Jack L. Warner saying that he was the best choice for the role and asked Warner to watch a certain episode of the series Maverick as proof. Ten days later Jackson was told to come to the studio to test for the role. Jackson won the role over several actors including the better known Will Hutchins, a Warner Brothers Television contract star who formerly played the sympathetic Sugarfoot and had also been in the No Time for Sergeants film.

Unlike Jim Nabors' Gomer Pyle (of the Andy Griffith Show spin off of the same name, inspired by No Time for Sergeants), Jackson's Stockdale was no idiot; rather he had an unlimited amount of common sense, which was displayed in various episodes.

His knowledge of farming leads him to give a better image interpretation analysis of an aerial photograph than Air Force Intelligence.
The Air Force attempts to demonstrate the efficiency of its survival training by pitting an Air Force survival trained group against an untrained group including Stockdale in the wilderness. Stockdale, with his backwoods knowledge, takes charge and gives his party a comfortable time similar to being in a resort, while the trained group barely survives.
Stockdale accepts latrine details as challenges rather than punishments and impresses the drill sergeant by how well he cleans the latrine.
Stockdale demonstrates another more appealing quality over Gomer Pyle when he unflinchingly takes punches to his stomach from a karate expert with a smile and a good natured lecture to his assailant  until Stockdale ends his lecture by knocking the karate expert through a window.
Stockdale has no reservations about drinking alcohol. However, the drill sergeant's attempts at getting Will drunk fail, with the implication that Will has built up a resistance to intoxication from a lifetime of drinking moonshine whiskey.

The series had an unusual episode, "Two Aces in a Hole", which resembled the 1964's films Dr Strangelove and Fail Safe (displaying nuclear destruction wrought by the US Air Force) combined with a black comedy parody of the hypnosis of The Manchurian Candidate.  Stockdale and his friend Ben witness a stage hypnotist's show (played by Pat Collins "The Hip Hypnotist") from backstage and are accidentally hypnotized to respond to code words that will turn them into World War II bomber pilots or revert them to their own selves.  Under the effects of hypnosis, the two airmen appropriate a bomber loaded with weapons, with which they attempt to nuke the now-friendly Germans.

Part of the William T. Orr-produced stable of Warner Bros. Television programs, the series was produced by George Burns's production company. It preceded Burns' own Wendy and Me sitcom (which starred Burns and Connie Stevens) on ABC's Monday night schedule. But, opposite The Andy Griffith Show, the series headlined by the original star of all the earlier versions of No Time For Sergeants, it was trounced in the ratings and only lasted one season.  It was also shown in the UK on ITV from 1965 to 1969.

Andy Clyde, formerly of The Real McCoys, had a supporting role in the television series as Grandpa Jim Anderson. Ann McCrea, while also appearing as a regular on The Donna Reed Show was cast as Amelia Taggert in the 1964 episode "O Krupnick, My Krupnick".

Episode list

Comics

A Dell Four Color Issue 914 comic book version of this story, illustrated by Alex Toth and published in July 1958, follows the movie's narrative. Three follow up issues in the 1960s tied into the short-lived TV series that starred Sammy Jackson.
Greg Theakston's Pure Imagination released The Alex Toth Reader, v2 in 2005. The art has been painstakingly reproduced from the originals by a process that has been come to be known as Theakstonization, a process by which the original comics have the color leached out, leaving only the black and white line art, which is then reproduced to appear exactly as it did at the time of original publication. One of the stories offered is the original movie adaptation.

References

External links
 
 No Time for Sergeants Original Broadway cast
 No Time for Sergeants at the Internet Broadway Database
 
 
 
 Milehigh Comics No Time for Sergeants (comic series)
 The Alex Toth Reader V.2 , which has the original art for the above movie adaptation. The art has been restored by Greg Theakston.
 The Alex Toth fans home page

1954 American novels
American Broadcasting Company original programming
1964 American television series debuts
1965 American television series endings
Black-and-white American television shows
Television series by Warner Bros. Television Studios
Military comedy television series
Dell Comics titles
Military humor
Plays by Ira Levin
1955 plays
Films directed by Mervyn LeRoy
Random House books
Novels set during World War II
Aviation television series
American novels adapted into plays
American novels adapted into television shows
American novels adapted into films
Novels adapted into comics